Canfari is an Italian surname. Notable people with the surname include:

Enrico Canfari (1877–1915), Italian footballer and sporting director
Eugenio Canfari (1877–1962), Italian footballer, brother of Enrico

Italian-language surnames